Wassa West District is a former district that was located in Western Region, Ghana. Originally created as an ordinary district assembly in 1988, which was created from the former Wassa-Fiase-Mpohor District Council. However, on 29 February 2008, it was split off into two new districts: Tarkwa-Nsuaem Municipal District (which it was elevated to municipal district assembly status on that same year; capital: Tarkwa) and Prestea-Huni Valley District (which it was elevated to municipal district assembly status on 15 March 2018; capital: Bogoso). The district assembly was located in the eastern part of Western Region and had Tarkwa as its capital town.

Sources
 
 GhanaDistricts.com

References

Districts of the Western Region (Ghana)